Neobuthus erigavoensis is a species of scorpion from the family Buthidae found in Somaliland.

Taxonomy 
Specimens of N. erigavoensis may have been collected and temporarily categorized as Neobuthus ferrugineus since 2012. They were defined as a separate species once a larger number of samples could be collected between 2016–2018. The species was named after its type location, which is near Erigavo city.

Description
Males have an average of 20–25 mm in length, while females have 21–25.5 mm. The pedipalps are relatively slender, of yellow colour, with a matte, finely granulated texture in males, and smooth and glossy on females. The body's base colour is of a pale yellow, and female pedipalps don't exhibit dark spots. The dorsal metasomal carinae is missing in females, a characteristic present only in this species and in Neobuthus montanus.

Distribution
N. erigavoensis can be found in Somalia, on rocky areas of semi-desert. Its type location is the outskirts of the village of Buq, near Erigavo, in the Sanaag region. The localities of Neobuthus erigavoensis are near to the localities of Neobuthus montanus.

References 

Endemic fauna of Somalia
Buthidae
Scorpions of Africa
Animals described in 2018